Minister of Development was a Cabinet ministry in the Parliament of Northern Ireland which governed Northern Ireland from 1921 to 1972.  The position was established in 1965 to mirror the United Kingdom Department of the Environment.

References
The Government of Northern Ireland

Executive Committee of the Privy Council of Northern Ireland
1965 establishments in Northern Ireland
1972 disestablishments in Northern Ireland